Alexander Winchell (December 31, 1824, in North East, New York – February 19, 1891, in Ann Arbor, Michigan) was a United States geologist who contributed to this field mainly as an educator and a popular lecturer and author. His views on evolution aroused controversy among his contemporaries; today the racism of these views is more cause for comment.

Biography

Education 
Winchell graduated from the Wesleyan University of Middletown, Connecticut, in 1847.

Early career 

He then taught at Pennington Male Seminary of New Jersey, Amenia Seminary of New York (where he had previously been a student), an academy in Newbern, Alabama, and the Mesopotamia Female Seminary of Eutaw, the last of which was founded by him. He became president of the Masonic University at Selma, Alabama, in 1853. He was elected as a member of the American Philosophical Society in 1865.

Michigan 

In 1854 Winchell entered the service of the University of Michigan as professor of physics and civil engineering. Eventually he became professor of geology and paleontology at Michigan.

In 1859, Winchell was appointed as State Geologist of Michigan for the newly formed second geological survey of the state. He held the post until 1863 when the state did not appropriate funding to continue the survey. The survey was resumed in 1869, and Winchell was reappointed in April. Owing to conflicting opinions between Winchell and his superiors, he resigned in 1871.

He stayed at Michigan until 1872.

Cotton Growing Venture
In 1863 Winchell took up a lease on a cotton plantation near Vicksburg, Mississippi, under a plan devised by Gen. Lorenzo Thomas to lease plantations along the Mississippi River to loyal men from the North, who would hire black laborers on terms prescribed by the army. Winchell organized the Ann Arbor Cotton Company and sold stock to the university's president, whereupon he received a leave of absence to engage in cotton planting.

General Thomas set wages at a low level ($7 per month for men, $5 for women, minus the cost of medical attention and clothing). Even then, many lessees defrauded the freedmen of their earnings. In the winter of 1863–64, the Treasury Department briefly assumed control of the Mississippi Valley labor system, mandated a substantial increase in black wages, and contemplated leasing the plantations directly to the freedmen. Winchell complained that the Treasury's regulations were "framed in the exclusive interest of the negro and in the non-recognition of the moral sense and patriotism of the white man."

Needless to say, the venture brought him nothing but problems, and after Winchell returned to Michigan in 1864, his brother Martin, who was managing the plantation, was killed by guerrillas.

Syracuse University 
In 1872, he was appointed chancellor of Syracuse University.  The depression of 1873 affected both his personal finances and those of Syracuse, and these troubles led him to resign this position in 1874.

Late career and controversy 

In 1875, he worked as a professor of geology and zoology at Vanderbilt University. There, his views on evolution, as expressed in his book Adamites and Preadamites: or, A Popular Discussion (1878), were not acceptable to the University administration because they diverged from Biblical teaching. Today the views on the "inferiority of the Negro" (quote from his 1878 book) would probably have been the focus of controversy. In any case, he was obligated to resign in 1878.

In 1888, he co-founded the Geological Society of America in Ithaca, New York along with John J. Stevenson, Charles H. Hitchcock, John R. Procter and Edward Orton. He served as the 3rd president of GSA in 1891.

He then returned to the University of Michigan, where he was professor of geology and paleontology.

His work in geology was not so significant as his teaching and popular lectures and writing in this field. He was much concerned with reconciling science and religion. He was an advocate of theistic evolution.

Legacy

The fish Clear chub Hybopsis winchelli (Girard, 1856) is named after him.

Works

Sketches of Creation (1870)
The Doctrine of Evolution (1874)
The Geology of the Stars (1874)
Reconciliation of Science and Religion (1877)
Adamites and Preadamites (1878)
World-Life or Comparative Geology (1883)
Preadamites Or, a Demonstration of the Existence of Men Before Adam (1888)
Sparks from a Geologist's Hammer
Geological Excursions
Geological Studies
Proof of Negro inferiority

References

External links
 
 

1824 births
1891 deaths
American geologists
University of Michigan faculty
Wesleyan University alumni
American non-fiction writers
19th-century American writers
Presidents of Syracuse University
People from North East, New York
Theistic evolutionists
Scientists from New York (state)
Presidents of the Geological Society of America